Frode Lamøy (born 2 April 1972) is a Norwegian-born drummer. He has played with bands such as Jack In The Box, Autopulver and TNT. He is also co-founder of the music and website development company Sounds Like You with his brother, Rune Lamøy.

Discography

Albums
Jack in the Box - Stigma (1995)
Shave - Shave (1996)
Autopulver - F-words (1997)
TNT - Firefly (1997)
Sphere - sirMania (1998)
TNT - Transistor (1999)
Autopulver - Vapor Trails (1999)
Ronni Le Tekrø - Extra Strong String (2000)
Gylder - Gnist (2004)
Magne F - Past Perfect Future Tense (2004)
Various Artists - Rørt og Urørt (2005)
One People - Tatanka Volume 1 (2006)

Singles / EPs
Jack in the Box - "Rockjumping" (1993)
Autopulver - "Frisbee" (1997)
Autopulver - "Funfair" (1998)
Autopulver - "Being Boring" (1998)
Autopulver - "Remedy/Surgery" (1999)
Autopulver - "If I Get Too Deep" (1999)
Autopulver - "Kissing Like a Mainstream" (2000)
Autopulver - "By Leaving Rome I Found My Home" (2000)
The Landlords - "Meant to Be" (2002)

External links
 Sounds Like You

1972 births
Living people
Norwegian rock drummers
Male drummers
TNT (Norwegian band) members
Place of birth missing (living people)
21st-century Norwegian drummers
21st-century Norwegian male musicians